Chan Ting-i is a Taiwanese politician. She is also known by the name Nicole Chan.

Early personal life
Chan's father Chan Yi-chang was a member of the Kuomintang and served on the Control Yuan. Chan Tang-i obtained her bachelor's degree in law from National Taiwan University in 1990, master's degree in law from University of London in the United Kingdom in 1990 and master of business administration from National Chengchi University in 2008.

National Communications Commission
Chan became the chairperson of the National Communications Commission on 1 August 2016. She resigned the position on 3 April 2019.

Later career
The Taiwan Network Information Center nominated Chan for a seat on the board of DotAsia Organisation. Voting was held in January 2020, and she was elected with the highest vote share.

References

Living people
Women government ministers of Taiwan
Government ministers of Taiwan
National Chengchi University alumni
1968 births
National Taiwan University alumni
Alumni of the University of London